Hru or HRU may refer to:

 HRU (security), a computer security model
 Human Resources University, part of the United States Office of Personnel Management
 Herington Regional Airport, in Kansas, United States
 Hruso languages, a proposed language family
 Hru, a minor Enochian angel
 Heavies Removal Unit A Unit in Natural-gas processing that removes C3+ Hydrocarbons from the Feed Gas